Pass the Paintbrush, Honey.... is the debut album by English indie pop band Biff Bang Pow!, released in 1985.

Track listing
Side A
"There Must Be a Better Life" - (03:14)
"Lost Your Dreams" - (02:00)
"Love and Hate" - (03:28)
"The Chocolate Elephant Man" - (03:08)
Side B
"Waterbomb!" - (02:02)
"Colin Dobbins" - (02:45)
"Wouldn't You" - (02:28)
"A Day Out with Jeremy Chester" - (04:05)

References

1985 debut albums
Biff Bang Pow! albums